Homefront is an American television drama series created and produced by Lynn Marie Latham and Bernard Lechowick in association with Lorimar Television for ABC which aired from September 24, 1991, to April 26, 1993. The show was set in the fictional city of River Run, Ohio, in 1945, 1946, and 1947. The show's theme song, "Accentuate the Positive", was written by Harold Arlen and Johnny Mercer and performed by Jack Sheldon.

Forty-two episodes were broadcast in the United States over two seasons from 1991 to 1993. TV Guide, Abigail Van Buren, and fans showed determination in getting ABC to continue the show for a third season before it was cancelled.

Characters

Main 

Jeff Metcalf (Kyle Chandler): Earnest young baseball player for the Cleveland Indians who finds romance where he least expects it; son of Stephen and Anne Metcalf; younger brother of Hank and Linda Metcalf.
Caroline Hailey (Sammi Davis): British war bride determined not to have any children.
Mike Sloan, Sr. (Ken Jenkins): Steel manufacturer dumbfounded by the inroads that unionization makes among his employees.
Ruth Sloan (Mimi Kennedy): Icy River Run socialite coming to grips with her Italian daughter-in-law; her only son, Mike, dies on his way home to Ohio.
Ginger Szabo (Tammy Lauren): Passionate, fast-talking young woman with dreams of fame on stage or screen.
Cpl. Robert Davis (Sterling Macer, Jr.; season 1): Decorated veteran who lands a job "on the line" at Sloan Industries but is isolated and belittled by racist co-workers; son of Abe and Gloria Davis; grandson of Rebecca Davis; great-great-grandson of a slave; served in Europe with the 761st Armored Battalion.  In the second season he is joined by Perrette, his white French war bride.
Lt. Hank Metcalf (David Newsom; season 1): Soldier who returns to River Run to find that everything has changed; son of Stephen and Anne Metcalf; older brother of Linda and Jeff Metcalf.
Sgt. Charlie Hailey (Harry O'Reilly): Veteran who puts his battlefield skills to use for the local union.
Anne Metcalf (Wendy Phillips): Widowed mother, displaced from work on the line at local steel manufacturer in September 1945; her world is turned on end when she falls in love again.
Gina Sloan (Giuliana Santini): Italian war bride who arrives in the U.S. only to find that her husband, Mike Sloan, Jr.,  has been killed; Jewish Holocaust survivor.
Linda Metcalf (Jessica Steen): Young woman who enjoys the fulfillment she finds in paying work; daughter of Stephen and Anne Metcalf; only sister of Hank and Jeff Metcalf; best friend of Ginger Szabo.
Abe Davis (Dick Anthony Williams): Father whose confidence in the American dream is tested by his son's experiences with racism; great-grandson of a slave; son of Rebecca Davis, who was disappointed when he married a dark-skinned woman; husband of Gloria Davis; father of Robert Davis; talented photographer; once played baseball in the Negro leagues; employed by Mike and Ruth Sloan as a chauffeur and man-about-the-house; shares apartment with his wife; dreams of owning a restaurant; attends Bethany Baptist Church.
Sarah Brewer (Alexandra Wilson; season 1): College co-ed romantically torn between her soldier, Hank Metcalf, and his brother, Jeff, whom she dated during the war; orphan; resident of boarding house; Protestant; studying to become a teacher.
Gloria Davis (Hattie Winston): Housekeeper who aspires to own a restaurant; wife of Abe Davis; daughter-in-law of Rebecca Davis; mother of Robert Davis; employed by Mike and Ruth Sloan as a maid and cook; only missed a single day of work when her son was born; cared for Mike Sloan, Jr. throughout his childhood; member of Bethany Baptist choir.
Al Kahn (John Slattery): No-nonsense union organizer who begins romancing Anne Metcalf; divorced, Jewish, possible former Communist sympathies, originally is interested in Anne's daughter.
Perrette Davis (Perrey Reeves; season 2): The White French war bride of Robert Davis; daughter-in-law of Abe and Gloria Davis; granddaughter-in-law of Rebecca Davis.
Judy Owens (Kelly Rutherford; season 2): Beautiful blonde bartender with a thing for baseball; parents are no longer alive; widowed when husband, Tom Owen, was shot down over the Pacific Ocean; lives in Clearwater, Florida, in apartment over the bar where she is employed; had affair with Mike Sloan Sr.

Recurring
Although Homefront operated largely around its main ensemble cast, guest stars were also featured. Notable repeat guests included:

 Sam Schenkkan (John DiSanti)
 Grandmother Davis (Montrose Hagins)
 Ed (Kevin Scott Allen) 
 Father Dreher  (Jonathan Terry)
 Jack (Randy Harrington)
 Coach Zelnick (James Gammon)
 Royal (Charles Fowlkes)
 Arthur Schillhab (Brian McNamara) 
 Mr. Melon (Jack Dodson)
 Miss Wescott (Lela Ivey)
 Miss Watkins (Sylvia Short)
 Phil Havel (Sam Behrens)
 Bill Caswell (Robert Duncan McNeill)
 Jonas (Fred Pinkars)
 Jay Tweed (Geoffrey Blake)

Episodes

Production and crew
Lynn Marie Latham (creator/writer/executive producer), Bernard Lechowick (creator/writer/executive producer), David Jacobs (executive producer), Diane Messina Stanley (supervising producer/writer), Sharron Miller (director), Lorraine Senna (director), Mike Vejar (director), James Stanley (writer/producer), David Carson (director), Bruce Seth Green (director), Christopher Chulack (producer/director), Félix Enríquez Alcalá (director), and Joseph L. Scanlan (director).

Broadcast and syndication 
Homefront was aired in the United States by the AmericanLife TV Network on Sundays at 10pm Eastern, but the network has since stopped airing the show.

Awards and nominations

References

External links
 
 

1990s American drama television series
American Broadcasting Company original programming
Television series by Lorimar Television
Television series set in the 1940s
Television shows set in Ohio
1991 American television series debuts
1993 American television series endings